is a Japanese economist. He is a professor at the University of Tokyo.

Biography
Matsui was born on August 28, 1962, in Tokyo, Japan. He is the nephew of Hideyuki Fujisawa who was a professional Go player.

He received a B.A. from University of Tokyo in 1985 and a Ph.D. from Northwestern University in 1990.

From 1990 to 1994, he taught at the University of Pennsylvania. From 1994 to 2001, he taught at the University of Tsukuba (joint appointment with University of Tokyo, 1998-2001). He then taught at the University of Tokyo.

Published works

Books

Journal article

Honors
 Ouchi Hyoe Prize (B.A. thesis), 1985
 Fulbright Scholarship, 1987–1989
 W.P. Carey Term Chair, University of Pennsylvania, 1990–1993
 Nikkei Book Award, 2003
 JSPS (Japan Society for the Promotion of Science) Prize, 2005
 Japan Academy Medal, 2006
 Nakahara Prize, 2007
 Fellow, Econometric Society, 2008

References

External links 

 Aki Matsui's HP
 Faculty profile at University of Tokyo
 Akihiko Matsui - VCASI

1962 births
Living people
20th-century Japanese economists
21st-century Japanese economists
Game theorists
University of Tokyo alumni
Northwestern University alumni
Academic staff of the University of Tokyo
Academic staff of the University of Tsukuba
University of Pennsylvania faculty
Fellows of the Econometric Society
Presidents of the Japanese Economic Association